Nassarina is a genus of sea snails, marine gastropod mollusks in the family Columbellidae, the dove snails.

Species
Species within the genus Nassarina include:
 Nassarina adamsi (Tryon, 1883)
 Nassarina anitae G. B. Campbell, 1961
 Nassarina atella H. A. Pilsbry & Lowe, 1932
 Nassarina bushiae (Dall, 1889)
 Nassarina cruentata (Mörch, 1860)
 Nassarina glypta (Bush, 1885)
 Nassarina helenae A. M. Keen, 1971
 Nassarina metabrunnea Dall & Simpson, 1901
 Nassarina pammicra H. A. Pilsbry & Lowe, 1932
 Nassarina perata A. M. Keen, 1971
 Nassarina procera Pelorce & Boyer, 2005
 † Nassarina proctorae M. Smith, 1936 
 Nassarina prouzetae Pelorce, 2020
 Nassarina rietae Segers & Swinnen, 2004
 Nassarina rolani Pelorce & Boyer, 2005
 Nassarina tehuantepecensis Shasky, 1970
 Nassarina thetys Costa & Absalao, 1998
 Nassarina vespera A. M. Keen, 1971
 Nassarina whitei P. Bartsch, 1928

The Global Names Index mentions also the following species 
 Nassarina piperata E. A. Smith, 1882
 Nassarina sparsipunctata Rehder, 1943
 Nassarina tincta P. P. Carpenter, 1864

Species brought into synonymy
 Nassarina columbellata (Dall, 1889): synonym of Metulella columbellata (Dall, 1889)
 Nassarina conspicua C. B. Adams, 1852: synonym of Zanassarina conspicua (C. B. Adams, 1852)
 Nassarina dalli Olsson & Harbison, 1953: synonym of Nassarina glypta (Bush, 1885)
 Nassarina dubia Olsson & McGinty, 1958: synonym of Redfernella dubia (Olsson & McGinty, 1958) (original combination)
 Nassarina grayi W. H. Dall, 1889 : synonym of Cytharomorula grayi (Dall, 1889) 
 Nassarina hancocki J. G. Hertlein & A. M. Strong, 1939: synonym of Steironepion hancocki (Hertlein & A. M. Strong, 1939) (original combination)
 Nassarina maculata (C. B. Adams, 1850): synonym of Steironepion maculatum (C. B. Adams, 1850)
 Nassarina melanosticta H. A. Pilsbry & Lowe, 1932: synonym of Steironepion piperatum (E. A. Smith, 1882)
 Nassarina minor C. B. Adams, 1845: synonym of Steironepion minus (C. B. Adams, 1845)
 Nassarina monilifera G.B. Sowerby I, 1844 : synonym of Steironepion moniliferum (G.B. Sowerby I, 1844) 
 Nassarina penicillata (Carpenter, 1864): synonym of Zanassarina penicillata (Carpenter, 1864)
 Nassarina poecila H. A. Pilsbry & Lowe, 1932: synonym of Zanassarina poecila (Pilsbry & H. N. Lowe, 1932)
 Nassarina pygmaea (Adams, 1850): synonym of Steironepion pygmaeum (C. B. Adams, 1850)
 Nassarina xeno Pilsbry & H. N. Lowe, 1932: synonym of Nassarina cruentata (Mörch, 1860)

References

 Pelorce J. (2017). Les Columbellidae (Gastropoda: Neogastropoda) de la Guyane française. Xenophora Taxonomy. 14: 4-21

External links
 Dall, W. H. (1889). Reports on the results of dredging, under the supervision of Alexander Agassiz, in the Gulf of Mexico (1877-78) and in the Caribbean Sea (1879-80), by the U.S. Coast Survey Steamer "Blake", Lieut.-Commander C.D. Sigsbee, U.S.N., and Commander J.R. Bartlett, U.S.N., commanding. XXIX. Report on the Mollusca. Part 2, Gastropoda and Scaphopoda. Bulletin of the Museum of Comparative Zoölogy at Harvard College. 18: 1-492, pls. 10-40.

Columbellidae